Loggerhead Park is a 17-acre recreational area in Juno Beach, Florida with a beach. It includes the Loggerhead Marinelife Center, an ocean conservation organization and sea turtle hospital. Loggerhead Marinelife Center manages the Juno Beach fishing pier, across the street from the park. The park is adjacent to Juno Dunes Natural Area off U.S. Highway 1.

References

External links
 Loggerhead Park - Palm Beach County Parks and Recreation

Parks in Palm Beach County, Florida
Beaches of Palm Beach County, Florida
Beaches of Florida